The King David High School, also known as King David High School in Crumpsall, Manchester, England, is a mixed, voluntary aided Jewish Orthodox academy school.

In 2015 it received an Ofsted report in 2015 of 'Outstanding'. and in 2016 was rated one of the country's top performing comprehensive schools in the GCSEs by The Telegraph.

Buildings and facilities 
The school's bid to relocate to Heaton Park area were opposed due to area conservation and increased traffic concerns.

Notable alumni
 Nick Blackman (born 1989), English-Israeli footballer

See also
Jewish day school

References

External links
 School website

Jewish day schools
Jewish schools in England
Jews and Judaism in Manchester
Academies in Manchester
Orthodox Judaism in England
Secondary schools in Manchester
Haredi Judaism in the United Kingdom